Rachel Abrams (née Decter; January 2, 1951 – June 7, 2013) was an American writer, editor, sculptor, and artist. She was the daughter of Moshe Decter and Midge Decter and wife of Elliott Abrams.

Career
She was a visual artist and sculptor, and her writing appeared in several publications including The Wall Street Journal, The Weekly Standard and Commentary, which was edited first by Abrams' step father, Norman Podhoretz, and later her half brother (both were children of Midge Decter), John Podhoretz.

Abrams was a board member of the Emergency Committee for Israel. A critic of liberal thinkers, she kept a politically oriented blog called Bad Rachel. In the 1970s, she spent three years working on Kibbutz Machanaynim in the Galilee. Of the Palestinians who kidnapped Gilad Shalit, Abrams wrote: ... the slaughtering, death-worshiping, innocent-butchering, child-sacrificing savages who dip their hands in blood and use women — those who aren't strapping bombs to their own devils' spawn and sending them out to meet their seventy-two virgins by taking the lives of the school-bus-riding, heart-drawing, Transformer-doodling, homework-losing children of Others — and their offspring — those who haven't already been pimped out by their mothers to the murder god — as shields, hiding behind their burkas and cradles like the unmanned animals they are, and throw them not into your prisons, where they can bide until they're traded by the thousands for another child of Israel, but into the sea, to float there, food for sharks, stargazers, and whatever other oceanic carnivores God has put there for the purpose.

Death
Rachel Abrams died on June 7, 2013, at the age of 62.  She had been battling stomach cancer for three years.

References

External links
 Bad Rachel Blog, badrachel.blogspot.com; accessed June 17, 2016.

1951 births
2013 deaths
American bloggers
American editors
American women sculptors
American women bloggers
American women editors
Jewish American writers
Deaths from stomach cancer
Deaths from cancer in the United States
21st-century American women writers
21st-century American sculptors
21st-century American Jews
Jewish women writers
Jewish bloggers